The men's 400 metres hurdles event at the 1997 Summer Universiade was held on 26, 27 and 28 August at the Stadio Cibali in Catania, Italy.

Medalists

Results

Heats

Semifinals

Final

References

IAAF 1997 ranking

Athletics at the 1997 Summer Universiade
1997